The Newport Steam Factory is an historic building at 449 Thames Street in Newport, Rhode Island. It was built in 1831 by a group of local businessmen in an effort to boost the local economy, which had suffered since the British occupation during the American Revolutionary War. The building was used as a cotton mill until 1857. In 1892 it was purchased by the Newport Illuminating Company. It is now part of the International Yacht Restoration School.

The building was listed on the National Register of Historic Places in 1972.

See also
National Register of Historic Places listings in Newport County, Rhode Island

References

External links

Industrial buildings completed in 1831
Industrial buildings and structures on the National Register of Historic Places in Rhode Island
Energy infrastructure on the National Register of Historic Places
Buildings and structures in Newport, Rhode Island
Historic American Buildings Survey in Rhode Island
National Register of Historic Places in Newport, Rhode Island
Historic district contributing properties in Rhode Island